Ohkamidani Tameike Dam is an earthfill dam located in Tottori prefecture in Japan. The dam is used for irrigation. The catchment area of the dam is 1 km2. The dam impounds about 15  ha of land when full and can store 1319 thousand cubic meters of water.

References

Dams in Tottori Prefecture
1973 establishments in Japan